Twist Bioscience is a public biotechnology company based in South San Francisco that manufactures synthetic DNA and DNA products for customers in a wide range of industries. Twist was founded in 2013 by Emily Leproust, Bill Banyai, and Bill Peck.

The company was represented by Leproust at a March 2021 tabletop exercise at the Munich Security Conference simulating an outbreak of weaponized monkeypox.

References

Companies based in South San Francisco, California
American companies established in 2013